Comadia speratus is a moth in the family Cossidae. It is found in North America, where it has been recorded from California.

The wingspan is about 15 mm. The forewings are white, with dark brown scaling at the costa. The hindwings are mouse-grey. Adults have been recorded on wing in May.

References

Natural History Museum Lepidoptera generic names catalog

Cossinae
Moths described in 1976
Moths of North America